The Calschistes de la bande ouest du Morvan is a geologic formation in France. It preserves fossils dating back to the Carboniferous period.

See also

 List of fossiliferous stratigraphic units in France

References
 

Carboniferous System of Europe
Carboniferous France